The yellow-faced horseshoe bat (Rhinolophus virgo) is a species of bat in the family Rhinolophidae. It is endemic to the Philippines.

References

Rhinolophidae
Mammals of the Philippines
Endemic fauna of the Philippines
Taxa named by Knud Andersen
Taxonomy articles created by Polbot
Mammals described in 1905
Bats of Southeast Asia